Galina Sosnova (born 9 May 1944) is a Russian former swimmer. She competed in the women's 4 × 100 metre freestyle relay at the 1960 Summer Olympics for the Soviet Union.

References

1944 births
Living people
Russian female swimmers
Olympic swimmers of the Soviet Union
Swimmers at the 1960 Summer Olympics
Swimmers from Moscow
Soviet female swimmers
Russian female freestyle swimmers